The 2010 Cup of Russia was the fifth event of six in the 2010–11 ISU Grand Prix of Figure Skating, a senior-level international invitational competition series. It was held at the Megasport Arena in Moscow on November 18–21. Medals were awarded in the disciplines of men's singles, ladies' singles, pair skating, and ice dancing. Skaters earned points toward qualifying for the 2010–11 Grand Prix Final.

Results

Men

Ladies

Pairs

Ice dancing

References

External links

 ISU Grand Prix
 ISU entries/results page
 
 
 Men's Entry list
 
 
 
 

Rostelecom Cup, 2010
Rostelecom Cup
2010 in Russian sport